Circuit Component  may refer to:

•Are devices that perform functions when they are connected in a circuit.

In engineering, science, and technology

Generic systems
System components, an entity with discrete structure, such as an assembly or software module, within a system considered at a particular level of analysis
Lumped element model, a model of spatially distributed systems

Electrical
Component video, a type of analog video information that is transmitted or stored as two or more separate signals
Electronic components, the constituents of electronic circuits
Symmetrical components, in electrical engineering, analysis of unbalanced three-phase power systems

Mathematics
Color model, a way of describing how colors can be represented, typically as multiple values or color components
Component (group theory), a quasi-simple subnormal sub-group
Connected component (graph theory), a maximal connected subgraph
Connected component (topology), a maximal connected subspace of a topological space
Vector component, result of the decomposition of a vector into various directions

Software
Component (UML), definition of component in the Unified Modeling Language
Component-based software engineering, a field within software engineering dealing with reusable software elements
Software component, a reusable software element with a specification, used in component-based software engineering

Other sciences
Component (thermodynamics), a chemically independent constituent of a phase of a system

Other uses
Component (VTA), a light-rail station in San Jose, California
Part of the grammatical structure of a sentence, a concept relating to the catena
Component ingredient, in a culinary dish

See also
Composition (disambiguation)
Decomposition (disambiguation)
Giant component
Identity component
Irreducible component
Spare part
Strongly connected component
Tangential and normal components
:Category:Components